Maracanã most commonly refers to the Maracanã Stadium in Rio de Janeiro, Brazil. It may also refer to:

People
 Arlindo Maracanã (born 1978), Brazilian footballer
 Domingos Maracanã (born March 1961), Brazilian volleyball player

Places
 Maracanã, Rio de Janeiro, a neighborhood in Rio de Janeiro, Brazil
 Maracanã River (Rio de Janeiro), Brazil, a river located in Maracanã neighborhood
 Maracanã, Pará, a Brazilian municipality located in Pará state
 Maracanã River (Amazonas), Brazil

Sports
 C.D. Maracaná San Rafael, a football club based in San Rafael Obrajuelo, El Salvador
 Maracanã Esporte Clube, a Brazilian football club
 Maracanã Stadium (Estádio do Maracanã), a stadium located in the Maracanã neighborhood, Rio de Janeiro, Brazil
 Ginásio do Maracanãzinho, an indoor sporting arena, located in the Maracanã neighborhood, near the stadium
 Estadio Parque Maracaná, a football stadium in Montevideo, Uruguay
 Estadio Maracaná, a football stadium in Panama City, Panama
 Marakana (Maracana) Stadium, a stadium located in Belgrade, Serbia

Other uses
 The red-shouldered macaw, a bird known in Brazil as maracanã
 Mini-macaws are known as maracanã in Portuguese